Milton Kibbee (January 27, 1896 – April 17, 1970) was an American film actor. He appeared in more than 360 films between 1933 and 1953. He was the brother of actor Guy Kibbee and his daughter was actress Lois Kibbee. He died in Simi Valley, California. His remains are interred at Oakwood Memorial Park Cemetery in Chatsworth, California.

Partial filmography

Central Airport (1933)
College Coach (1933)
Little Big Shot (1935) unbilled
Moonlight on the Prairie (1935)
Fugitive in the Sky (Unbilled) (1936)
Bengal Tiger (1936)
Murder by an Aristocrat (1936)
Times Square Playboy (1936)
Back in Circulation (1937)
 The Lady Escapes (1937)
Smart Blonde (1937)
The Gladiator (1938)
Overland Stage Raiders (1938)
The Roaring Twenties (1939) as a Cab Driver (uncredited)
Mr. Smith Goes to Washington (1939) as a Reporter (uncredited)
Strike Up the Band  (1940) Mr. Holden
That Gang of Mine (1940)
Too Many Blondes (1941)
The Lone Rider and the Bandit (1941)
Across the Sierras (1941)
Billy the Kid's Range War (1941)
The Lone Rider in Cheyenne (1942)
In Old California (1942)
Saboteur (1942) - Man Killed in Movie Theater (uncredited)
Billy the Kid Trapped (1942)
Billy the Kid's Smoking Guns (1942)
Western Cyclone (1943)
Blazing Frontier (1943)
Bowery to Broadway (1944)
The Story of Dr. Wassell (1944)
Johnny Doesn't Live Here Any More (1944)
I Won't Play (1944)
Three of a Kind (1944)
Junior Prom (1946)
Strange Holiday (1946)
Daughter of the West (1949)
County Fair (1950)
Woman on the Run (1950)
When the Redskins Rode (1951)
The Whip Hand (1951)

References

External links

1896 births
1970 deaths
American male film actors
Actors from Santa Fe, New Mexico
Male actors from New Mexico
Burials at Oakwood Memorial Park Cemetery
20th-century American male actors